War Horse (Original Motion Picture Soundtrack) is the score album to the 2011 film of the same name directed by Steven Spielberg. Spielberg's norm collaborator John Williams composed and conducted the score for the film, the second score composed the same year by Williams for Spielberg after The Adventures of Tintin. The score featured a 90-piece orchestra performing the orchestral music and was recorded during March and April 2011. It was released on 21 December 2011 by Sony Classical Records, four days prior to the film's release. The soundtrack was also released in German in February 2012, to accompany with the dubbed release of Gefährten in Germany.

The soundtrack received positive response from critics, and Williams received nomination for Best Original Score category at the 84th Academy Awards (also for Spielberg's The Adventures of Tintin), but lost to French composer Ludovic Bource for his score for The Artist (2011). It also received nominations for Original Score at Golden Globe, BAFTA and Satellite Award, which was also lost to The Artist.

Development 
Williams took inspiration by visiting a horse farm in California and observing horses and their behavior, elaborating that "I got in the habit of watching the horses in the morning, and I began to see how they connect to each other and how they became curious about me. That's when I really began to get the sense that horses are very special creatures. They have been magnificent and trusted friends for such a long time and have done so much for us with such grace."

Williams was also influenced by the geographic scope of the film's story. In regard to that approach, Williams stated: 

The score was recorded in late March and early April 2011, by a 90-piece orchestra, with Williams comparing the recording sessions more to a concert piece rather than a traditional film score, as it relied more on the individual performance of the musicians. Tuba player Jim Self reported in May 2011, saying that he had recorded the score segment, which involved a "lot of brass—but it was gentle music often." English folk singer John Tams, who wrote the songs for the stage production of War Horse, was approached by Spielberg and Williams about including one of his songs from the stageshow in the film. The score was mixed and designed by Gary Rydstrom.

In the liner notes to the film soundtrack's CD, Spielberg wrote, "I feel that John has made a special gift to me of this music, which was inspired not only by my film but also by many of the picturesque settings of the poet William Wordsworth, whose vivid descriptions of the British landscape inspired much of what you are going to hear." In the premiere of three of the tracks on New York radio station WQXR's "Movies on the Radio", broadcaster David Garland drew parallels with the work of British composer Ralph Vaughan Williams. Several unreleased scores were featured in the For Your Consideration album in order to be nominated for major awards season.

Track listing

Reception 
Writing for AllMusic, William Ruhlmann said "This is certainly not one of Williams' light adventure scores à la Star Wars or Raiders of the Lost Ark, nor horror music such as Jaws. Rather, it contains both homey and disturbing parts, within the overall context of an old-fashioned orchestral movie soundtrack." Nathan Cone of Texas Public Radio said "The early cues are pastoral, and evocative of the Dartmoor countryside. The music is ripe with Celtic influences, and a friend of mine even picked out a quote from an old Irish sea chantey. There are few big themes established, but the mood is set as a young boy takes in a steed named Joey.  Midway through the album, the mood turns more somber, as Joey is placed into service."

James Southall of Movie Wave wrote "the score on the album plays out along a very well-developed dramatic path – listening to the album really is like hearing a story told through music – is testament to his [Williams'] great gifts". Mfiles-based Sean Wilson wrote "It's the orchestral nuances; it's the memorability of the themes themselves (regardless of whether they get stand-alone arrangements); it's the complex tapestry of emotions that take the listener on an emotional journey. Even in his advancing years, Williams refuses to rest on his laurels, always pushing himself to come up with stunning music that matches Spielberg's vision." Jonathan Broxton wrote "Williams’ work in [War Horse] is to be amongst the best of the year. He provides Joey – who is, obviously, incapable of conveying human emotion – with a voice and a heart, and allows the film to tell the story of his life with scope, grandeur and an epic sweep, but which is also not afraid to convey a sense of intimacy when required. It also shows Williams to be a master dramatist, expertly pushing the audience's buttons in all the right places with a score that is beautiful to the ear, intellectually stimulating to the brain through its thematic complexity and narrative flow, and stirring to the soul."

The Guardian's Andrew Puliver and The Prague Reporter's Jason Pirodsky called the score as "persistently soaring" and "swells up on the soundtrack". Classic FM wrote "War Horse is a mix of pastoral folky numbers and full-on orchestral blow-outs as the films moves from the English countryside to wartime France." Filmtracks.com wrote "being a Williams score, this music relies on the intelligence of its constructs to succeed, and in that regard, the composer continues to prove that he is at the top of his game. Rather than worry about the difficultly he faced when being forced to abandon all of his many themes halfway through the picture, enjoy each portion of War Horse for its inherent saturation with Williams' trademark sensibilities."

Accolades

References

External links 

 

2010s film soundtrack albums
2011 soundtrack albums